Manjeet Singh may refer to:

Manjeet Singh (cricketer) (born 1991), Indian cricketer
Manjeet Singh (rower) (born 1988), Indian rower
Manjeet Singh Ral (born 1985), English singer, songwriter and music producer
 Manjeet Singh, a character created by YouTuber Lilly Singh as an exaggeration of her father

See also
Manjit Singh (disambiguation)